Sun Yang (born 1 December 1991) is a Chinese Olympic and world-record-holding competitive swimmer. In 2012, Sun became the first Chinese athlete to win an Olympic swimming gold medal. Sun is the first male swimmer in history to earn Olympic and World Championship gold medals at every freestyle distance from 200 to 1500 metres. A three-time Olympic gold medalist and eleven-time world champion, he is the most decorated Chinese swimmer in history. In 2017, NBC Sports described him as "arguably the greatest freestyle swimmer of all time".

In September 2018, Sun was involved in an incident during an out-of-competition anti-doping test at his home. FINA concluded that Sun did not commit an anti-doping rule violation. On 28 February 2020, Court of Arbitration for Sport (CAS) delivered its findings, overturning FINA's decision and banning Sun for eight years for tampering with the doping control process. However CAS also ruled that Sun would not officially lose any of his medals because "doping tests performed on the Athlete shortly before and after the aborted doping control in September 2018 were negative" and that "in the absence of any evidence that the Athlete may have engaged in doping activity since 4 September 2018, including on the occasion of the FINA World Championships in Gwangju, South Korea in July 2019, the results achieved by the Athlete in the period prior to the CAS award being issued should not be disqualified". On 22 June 2021, after the retrial of the case, the CAS upheld the ban but reduced the suspension time to 4 years and three months.

Early life 
Sun was born on 1 December 1991 in Hangzhou, Zhejiang, China. He was named after his parents' surnames. Sun is an only child, and his family is athletic. His father, Sun Quanhong (孙全洪), was a basketball player for Anhui Tigong and is also tall. His mother, Yang Ming (杨明), was a volleyball player for Zhejiang and is a sports coach. Sun started swimming in 1998, and his potential was recognised by a teacher at Jinglun Sports School in Hangzhou.

Career

2007–2011: Early career 
Sun made his international debut at the 2007 World Championships in Melbourne, Australia. He finished 32nd in the 400 metre freestyle and 23rd in the 800 metre freestyle. In early 2008, he competed at the "Good Luck Beijing" China Open, a test event for the 2008 Summer Olympics. He finished 2nd in the 400 metre freestyle with a time of 3:49.34. At the Olympics, Sun, aged 16, finished 28th in the 400 metre freestyle, unable to reach the final. He later came 7th in the qualifying heats of the 1500 metre freestyle, reaching the final, where he finished last. Sun rebounded the following year at the 2009 World Championships, where he won his first international medal, a bronze, in the 1500 metre freestyle with a time of 14:46.84. He finished 18th in the 400 metre freestyle with a time of 3:47.51.

Sun achieved further success during the 2010 Asian Games. He won gold medals in the 1500 metre freestyle and the 4 × 200 metre freestyle relay, and silver medals in the 200 metre and 400 metre freestyle. His 1500-metre freestyle time of 14:35.43 was a new Asian record and the second-fastest time in history, behind Grant Hackett, whose record Sun would surpass the following year. Sun was subsequently named Rookie of the Year at the 2010 China Central Television (CCTV) Sports Awards.

On the first day of competition at the 2011 World Championships in Shanghai, Sun came 2nd in the 400 metre freestyle with a time of 3:43.24, 1.2 seconds behind South Korean Park Tae-hwan. Three days later, Sun won his first World Championship title in the 800 metre freestyle with a time of 7:38.57. After a day of rest, he swam the anchor leg in the 4 × 200 metre freestyle relay, helping the Chinese team win bronze. The last day of competition, Sun competed in the 1500 metre freestyle. He won the race with a time of 14:34.14, ten seconds ahead of the rest of the competition. At age 19, Sun beat Hackett's world record of 14:34.56, which had stood for ten years. This was the longest-held world record in swimming and the only men's swimming world record not to have been beaten during the techsuit era.

2012: Breakthrough at the Olympics
For the 2012 Summer Olympics, Sun was considered a favourite in the 400 metre and 1500 metre freestyle, as well as a contender in the 200 metre freestyle. In his first event, the 400 metre freestyle, he won the gold medal with a time of 3:40.14, breaking the Olympic record previously held by Ian Thorpe and becoming the first Chinese male swimmer to win a gold medal at the Olympics. His time was also the third fastest in history, 0.07 seconds away from the world record, and setting a new Asian record. After a day of recuperating, Sun competed in the 200 metre freestyle. He won a silver medal in the final, tying with Park Tae-hwan with a time of 1:44.93, a new national record. The following day, Sun swam the anchor leg in the 4 × 200 metre freestyle relay to help the Chinese team win bronze, China's first Olympic medal in a men's relay event.

After the relay, Sun did not return to the pool until the last day of competition to compete in his strongest event, the 1500 metre freestyle. He had qualified for the final with the fastest time. At the initial line-up on the starting blocks, a step-down command was issued because of noise from the crowd, but instead of stepping back, Sun reacted by diving in. The officials ruled the early dive was the result of crowd noise and did not constitute a false start, and Sun was allowed to continue in the competition. He went on to win the race with a time of 14:31.02, breaking his own world record by over three seconds. He finished over eight seconds ahead of second-place finisher, Canadian Ryan Cochrane. With two gold medals and a team bronze medal, Sun became the most decorated Chinese male swimmer in Olympic history, and the first swimmer to win the 400/1500 double since Vladimir Salnikov at the 1980 Moscow Olympics. Sun completed the last 50 metres of the race in 25.68 seconds, nearly two seconds faster than Cochrane.

2013: Continued success
From 28 July to 4 August 2013, Sun competed at the World Championships. On the first day of competition, he won gold in the 400 metre freestyle with a time of 3:41.59. It was nearly 1.5 seconds off his Olympic-winning time from the previous year, but he was still 3.23 seconds ahead of runner-up Kosuke Hagino. Two days later, Sun retained his title in the 800 metre freestyle with a time of 7:41.36. It was his second gold medal in the Championship and the 100th gold medal won by China in World Aquatics Championships' history.

On the sixth day of competition, Sun was tasked with swimming the anchor leg for the 4 × 200 metre freestyle relay. China barely qualified for the final in eighth place. Going into the last leg of the race, China was in fifth place, over two seconds behind France and Japan, but Sun was able to overtake both teams in the end for a final time of 1:43.16. This was the second-fastest split time in history and 1.82 seconds faster than the other 31 swimmers in the final, including Ryan Lochte and Yannick Agnel. Accounting for the relay exchange advantage, it was still over a second faster than his flat start time of 1:44.93.

On the final day of the competition, Sun successfully defended his title in the 1500 metre freestyle. He finished with a time of 14:41.15, beating runner-up Ryan Cochrane by 1.33 seconds. This result made Sun the second swimmer in history, after Grant Hackett, to win gold medals in all three long-distance freestyle events—400, 800, and 1500 metre—in a single World Championships.

One month later, Sun competed in the 2013 National Games of China. Aiming to become the first man to win seven gold medals at a single championship, he added to his range the 100 metre freestyle, an event typically reserved for sprinters. With the games holding the same schedule as the Olympics, he competed first in the 400 metre freestyle, winning in 3:43.68—over a second ahead of Hao Yun. The following day, Sun won the 4 × 100 metre freestyle relay, swimming the anchor leg in 48.14 seconds. He followed these performances the next day by setting a new Asian record in the 200 metre freestyle with a time of 1:44.47, about half a second faster than his time in London. The following day, he won bronze in the 100 metre freestyle, finishing with a time of 48.94 seconds, his first time finishing under 49 seconds.

2014: Doping ban and Asian Games 

In May 2014, the Chinese Swimming Association banned Sun for three months after he tested positive for trimetazidine, a drug that was banned four months earlier and classified as a stimulant at the time by the World Anti-Doping Agency (WADA). Sun said that a doctor prescribed the drug to treat heart palpitations, a condition he has suffered since 2008, and was unaware that it had been newly added to the banned substances list. After reviewing the full case file, WADA chose not to pursue the case after an investigation. They also announced that they would not challenge the CSA's decision to impose a three-month sanction. Since Sun's ban, WADA has reclassified trimetazidine from an S6 stimulant (prohibited in competition) to an S4 hormone and metabolic modulator (prohibited in and out of competition).

Following his doping ban, Sun made a comeback in his first post-suspension event in the 2014 China Spring Nationals, where he won a gold medal in the 200 metre freestyle. At the 2014 Asian Games, Sun participated in the 200, 400, and 1500 metre freestyle events. He won silver in the 200 metre freestyle, finishing behind Kosuke Hagino. In the 400 metre freestyle, he came 1st with a time of 3:43.23, which was 1.25 seconds ahead of runner-up Hagino. Leading from start to finish, Sun won gold in the 1500 metre freestyle. He finished with a time of 14:49.75, over five seconds ahead of runner-up Kohei Yamamoto. Sun also participated in the 4 × 100 metre freestyle relay, helping China win gold with an overall time of 3:13.17, setting a new Asian Record in the event.

2015 World Championships 

At the 2015 World Championships, Sun won silver in the 200 metre freestyle with a time of 1:45.20, finishing 0.06 seconds behind James Guy. In the 400 metre freestyle, he won gold with a time of 3:42.58, finishing 1.17 seconds ahead of Guy. He finished 1st in the 800 metre freestyle with a time of 7:39.96, which was 0.85 seconds ahead of runner-up Gregorio Paltrinieri.

In the 1500 metre freestyle, where he was the two-time defending champion, Sun withdrew from the competition, later citing heart problems during a warm-up. "I feel very sorry that I couldn't be present for the 1500m", Sun told reporters. "I didn't feel good in my heart. Today I felt really uncomfortable at the pool during my warm-up and I had to give up the idea of competing. I feel really sorry about that."

At the World Championships, Sun was accused by Brazilian coaches of assaulting one of their female swimmers, Larissa Oliveira. Brazil team spokeswoman Eliana Alves told the Associated Press that there was "contact" between Sun and Oliveira, "but it was not a fight". Swimming's world governing body, FINA, later cleared Sun of any wrongdoing. FINA executive director Cornel Marculescu explained that the altercation that led to a complaint against Sun was due to congestion in the warm-up pool, and did not warrant further action. According to Marculescu, there were over 1,000 swimmers present, so the preparation pool became very crowded.

2016: Historic first at the Olympics 

In June 2016, Sun competed at the Arena Pro Swim Series finale in Santa Clara, California. He won the 200 metre freestyle event with a time of 1:44.82, giving him 1st in the world ranks.

At the 2016 Summer Olympics, Sun won the 200 metre freestyle with a time of 1:44.65, finishing 0.55 seconds ahead of runner-up Chad le Clos. It was Sun's first major international title in this event, and he became the first Chinese athlete to win a gold medal in this event. He won a silver medal in the 400 metre freestyle with a time of 3:41.68, finishing 0.13 seconds behind Mack Horton of Australia. Sun finished 16th in the qualifying heats of the 1500 metre freestyle, clocking in at 15:01.97. With his 200-metre freestyle gold medal and his 400 and 1500 metre freestyle gold medals from the 2012 Summer Olympics, Sun became the first swimmer in history to win Olympic gold medals in the 200, 400, and 1500 metre freestyle events.

The lead-up to the 400 metre freestyle was marred by controversy. Sun was accused of splashing water into rival Horton's face during practice. Horton accused Sun of attempting to distract him. Sun and Xu Qi, the Chinese swim team manager, denied the allegations and said it must have been a misunderstanding. Horton responded by accusing Sun of being a "drug cheat", in reference to his 2014 suspension. Horton's social media pages garnered negative criticism from Chinese fans, with many calling the Australian as a racist, a "snake", and a "disrespectful person". The Chinese Swimming Association requested an apology for the allegation, stating that Horton's claims "have greatly damaged sporting ties between China and Australia, and damaged the image of Australian athletes"; the request was turned down. Further controversy arose when the Global Times, a Chinese newspaper, printed critical editorials about Australia. An op-ed piece in another Chinese newspaper, Changjiang Daily, called for calm and indicated that the dispute was only between the two athletes and should not become a conflict between the two countries.

2017–18: Asian Games success and testing incident 

In 2017, Sun competed at the World Championships. In the 200 metre freestyle, Sun won gold with a time of 1:44.39, setting a new Asian and Chinese national record. In the 400 metre freestyle, he won gold with a time of 3:41.38, finishing 2.47 seconds ahead of runner-up Mack Horton and winning his third straight 400 metre freestyle world title. Sun finished 5th in the 800 metre freestyle, failing to defend his title. He withdrew from the 1500 metre freestyle.

In August 2018, Sun competed in every freestyle event from the 200 to the 1500 metre freestyle at the Asian Games. He also competed in the 4 × 100 and 4 × 200 metre freestyle relay events. In the 200 metre freestyle, Sun won gold with a time of 1:45.43. He finished 1st in the 400 metre freestyle with a time of 3:42.92, over four seconds ahead of runner-up Naito Ehara. By beating Horton's time of 3:43.76 from the 2018 Commonwealth Games, Sun became the number-one swimmer in the world for that event for 2018. In the men's 800 metre freestyle, which was introduced to the Asian Games for the first time, he won gold with a time of 7:48.36. In the 1500 metre freestyle, he finished 1st with a time of 14:58.53, beating runner-up Nguyễn Huy Hoàng by over three seconds. It was the first time Sun swam the event within 15 minutes since the 2014 Asian Games, and his third consecutive Asian Games title in the 1500 metre freestyle. Representing China, Sun helped his team finish second in the 4 × 100 metre freestyle relay with an overall time of 3:13.29, behind Japan's time of 3:12.68. In the 4 × 200 metre freestyle relay, he helped China win silver with an overall time of 7:05.45, behind Japan's 7:05.17.

In September 2018, Sun experienced an out-of-competition test at his home. Following investigations, FINA's inquiry panel ultimately concluded that "Mr. Sun Yang has not committed an anti-doping rule violation", which FINA accepted. In December at the 2018 FINA World Swimming Championships (25 m), Sun participated in the 4 × 200 metre freestyle relay, helping China win bronze.

2019 World Championships 
At the 2019 World Championships, Sun finished 2nd behind Danas Rapšys in the 200 metre freestyle. After the race was over, Rapšys was disqualified for a false start, giving Sun the gold and his third straight medal in the event at the World Championships. In the 400 metre freestyle, Sun won gold with a time of 3:42.44, finishing 0.73 seconds ahead of runner-up Horton and earning his fourth consecutive title in this event. He is the first and the only swimmer to do so.

Sun clashed with Duncan Scott during the 200 metre freestyle presentation. Both the British and Australian camps had been critical about Sun's actions the year prior. Scott refused to share the podium with Sun, and neither competitor shook hands, after which Sun could be seen gesturing and shouting at Scott. In a similar incident a few days earlier, Australian swimmer Mack Horton had also refused to share the podium with Sun. Horton was given an official warning by the sport's organising body, FINA. Following the medal ceremonies, Horton, Scott, and Sun were served letters by FINA, warning them about their behaviour. In a statement, FINA said: "While FINA respects the principle of freedom of speech, it has to be conducted in the right context ... [athletes should not] use FINA events to make personal statements or gestures".

Despite Horton not having any evidence of cheating against Sun Yang, except for the circumstantial FINA and later CAS ruling against Sun on unrelated charges, he claims to “know” that Sun Yang was doping, and says his stance is not personal or due to national prejudice.

Doping allegation and controversies

2014 ban
In May 2014, Sun was banned for three months by the Chinese Swimming Association (CSA) after he tested positive for trimetazidine, a drug that was banned four months earlier and classified as a stimulant at the time by the World Anti-Doping Agency (WADA). The substance was at the time prohibited in competition only; the ingestion of trimetazidine by an athlete out of competition "is inconsequential" and constitutes illicit behaviour only if the athlete later participates in competition before the substance clears their system. Sun said that a doctor prescribed the drug to treat heart palpitations, a condition he has suffered since 2008, and that he was unaware that it had been newly added to the banned substances list. He was eligible to file a medical exception to use the drug for his heart condition, but he did not do so.

The World Anti-Doping Agency (WADA) admonished the Chinese Swimming Association for tardiness in reporting the failed test and the subsequent ban until after it had been served, meaning that Sun never missed a major event. FINA's handling of the case was criticized for allegedly "protect[ing] one of the sport's biggest stars in a key market". According to Swimming World Magazine, Sun's mother Yang Ming said in a now-deleted social media post that the Chinese Swimming Association attempted to hide Sun's three-month suspension in 2014.

In January 2015, WADA reclassified and downgraded trimetazidine from "stimulant" to "modulator of cardiac metabolism", prohibiting its use out of competition in addition to the previous prohibition of use in competition. Ben Nichols, a WADA representative, explained that drugs like trimetazidine are reclassified and downgraded when they are recognised as being less likely to be used as doping agents and trimetazidine will be moved off the prohibited stimulant list as of January 1, 2015. It remains a banned substance . WADA criticised the CSA for its lateness in reporting the failed test result and subsequent ban until after it had been served. WADA, which had a right to petition if it believes a sanction to be lenient, chose not to take further action after reviewing the case. CHINADA (China Anti-Doping Agency) deputy director Zhao Jia said that "Sun proved with sufficient evidence that he did not intend to cheat, which helped reduce his ban to three months", but he was stripped of his win in the 1500 metre freestyle at the 2014 Chinese nationals. One Australian writer opined that the punishment was lenient, but pointed out that Yang was not found to have doped intentionally. After the ban, Swimming Australia ordered coach Denis Cotterell to stop working with Sun, but Cotterell continued coaching him.

2018 testing incident and 2020 ban
On the night of 4 September 2018, three anti-doping testers arrived at Sun's house to administer an out-of-competition blood and urine test. After giving blood, he was escorted to the bathroom by a doping control assistant (DCA) to be observed passing urine. Sun noticed the DCA had been taking pictures of him and requested his accreditations, which were not provided. The DCA later said he was a construction worker.

After calling his coach, his lawyer, and the head of the Chinese swimming delegation, Sun did not sign the testing paperwork in which Sun argued the doping control officer's paperwork was incomplete and two of the three members of the anti-doping party lacked proper identification. According to evidence presented to the Court of Arbitration for Sport (CAS), he offered to wait for a properly accredited team, but was declined. The anti-doping testers later testified to the CAS that Sun and his entourage intimidated them.

Around 3:00 am, Sun's camp and the anti-doping testers were at a standoff. Sun's entourage including his doctor Ba Zhen, had refused to let the testers take his blood vials. The testers refused to leave without their casing and had refused Sun's offer to wait for an accredited team to replace them. Sun's team then directed his security guard to smash the case containing the vials to take back the vials containing Sun's blood. Sun believed that the testing personnel did not have proper credentials.

The official report from the FINA inquiry dated 3 January 2019 stated the following:

The inquiry panel concluded that "Mr. Sun Yang has not committed an anti-doping rule violation", which FINA accepted. Their official inquiry report concluded that the testing officer indeed did not abide to the proper testing protocol. WADA disagreed with FINA's decision and appealed to the Court of Arbitration for Sport (CAS), which accepted the case and held a public hearing in November 2019. Sun's lawyers told the Associated Press he requested that his CAS hearing to be public and "fully transparent to clear his name". FINA supported a move to stop the CAS hearing.

In January 2019, The Sunday Times published an article reporting that Sun and his team smashed vials of blood samples with a hammer in front of anti-doping testers and that he may face a lifetime ban. Sun's lawyers decided to take legal action against The Sunday Times, denouncing all claims made in the report.

CAS issued a report on 20 August 2019, stating the appeal hearing brought by WADA against Sun and FINA in September had been postponed due to a party's unexpected personal circumstances. It was announced that the hearing date would be rescheduled and made open to the public, including to the media, as requested. WADA requested for a ban of between two and eight years according to a later media release from CAS.

According to Sun's coach Dennis Cotterell, the drug test conducted on the 4 September 2018, was the swimmer's ninth drug test in two weeks. Sun had just finished competing in the Asian Games in Jakarta, Indonesia two days earlier. Sun Yang had competed and won Gold medals in the 200, 400, 800 and 1,500 metres freestyle. During the Asian Games, he had been tested five times and had passed all tests without any adverse analytical findings.

A year before the 2018 testing incident, Sun had heated tensions with the same unnamed female doping control officer who presided over his sample collection in the 2018 incident. In 2017, the officer was a doping control assistant in training to become an officer. Sun wrote that the DCA "lacked proper accreditation and also lacked authorization to perform her assigned role". The report covering the 2017 disagreements of Sun and his testers did not clearly indicate that the quarrels were ever resolved.

On 15 November 2019, the public hearing was held at CAS in Montreux, Switzerland. It was live streamed and released online. The hearing was affected by translation issues throughout the day. According to Time, the translation issues made it unclear how much of the testimony and questions were understood, and both judges and lawyers expressed frustration. The transcript of Sun's final remarks in Chinese during the public hearing was posted online by Sun himself after the hearing.

On 18 November, the DCA, who remained anonymous and did not appear at the hearing, said that he was a construction worker rather than a trained doping tester. According to Xinhua News Agency, he had submitted his written testimony in Chinese to CAS and WADA several days before the hearing.  WADA's lead counsel Richard Young referred to "concerns over intimidation and protection issues", while during cross-examination of witnesses WADA co-counsel Brent Rychener highlighted the threats and warnings made by members of Sun's entourage to the testing officers, including exchanges involving the swimmer's mother, Dr. Ba Zhen (the head of the Chinese Swimming Association), and Dr. Han Zhaoqi (the head of the Zheijang Anti-Doping Center). The WADA provided witness statements from the DCO and the BCA, indicating that they had been contacted by Sun's entourage and were "concerned for their physical and economic well-being, and for the well-being of their family members". They indicated they were "fearful that, if they would agree to testify in this proceeding, they would suffer significant retaliation in some form from [Sun Yang] and/or his entourage and supporters". WADA further noted if they had not issued an order, there would be little or no chance that IDTM's Sample Collection Personnel would be willing to testify under such threats.

On 28 February 2020, a panel of three senior judges at CAS unanimously found Sun guilty of refusing to co-operate with sample testers and banned him from swimming until February 2028. The eight year ban, the maximum CAS can hand out, was imposed because it was his second offence after his 2014 suspension.

The panel said: 

WADA issued a statement welcoming the verdict, saying that the "CAS ruling confirms those concerns" about the original FINA decision that seemed to be incorrect under the World Anti-Doping Code. The ban rules Sun out for the 2020 Tokyo Olympics and "effectively ends his career". The only remaining possibility for Sun and his legal team is to appeal the decision to the Swiss Federal Court, but only on narrow procedural grounds. The court ruled that Sun can maintain the two world titles he won in South Korea.

Soon after the verdict was announced, Sun told Xinhua News Agency he would definitely appeal the "unfair" ban. Some analysts said the hearing was marred by severe translation problems, conflict of interest, and bias. One Australian sports writer suggested that there was hypocrisy and double standards against Sun, with an actual "absence of evidence" around doping activity.

When the verdict was announced, Chinese online users continued to defend Sun while insulting his chief rival Mack Horton. An unnamed analyst noted that the harassment against Horton—which had been ongoing since 2016—was likely "state-orchestrated" on Sun's behalf, saying: "the [Horton] family's ordeal is believed to be well-organised and part of a systematic pattern of harassment and intimidation directed at perceived critics of China". This is not an amateur operation. The Hortons' story is very disturbing … It says something about the reach of foreign powers within Australia." According to Jonathan White at SCMP, some Chinese users bypassing China's Great Firewall to log onto Instagram apologized to Horton for the harassment, with statements that include "sometimes our Chinese could not get the truth, but most of us are kind and goodness person" (sic), criticizing Sun as "arrogant" and a "baby", and noted that "Sun deleted all of his post-verdict posts purporting to offer new 'evidence'".

The CAS decision against Sun Yang was scrutinized, and many unknown facts about the case were brought to light, in an article published at Sports Integrity Initiative. The article alleged political bias in the three judge CAS panel and exhibited tweets from the panel president, former Italian Foreign Minister Franco Frattini, who in his tweets castigated the practice of dog slaughter and denounced the consumption of dog meat at a Chinese festival. The South China Morning Post identified one of Frattini's tweets as "describing one person who appeared to mistreat a dog as a 'yellow face Chinese monster'". It also reported that Frattini denied that he was being a racist for his tweets. With the revelations of this article, Sun Yang's legal team filed a second request to appeal the verdict. This appeal was successful.

The CAS clarified that Sun ("the Athlete") would not be stripped of any of his medals because "doping tests performed on the Athlete shortly before and after the aborted doping control in September 2018 were negative" and "in the absence of any evidence that the Athlete may have engaged in doping activity since 4 September 2018, including on the occasion of the FINA World Championships in Gwangju, South Korea in July 2019, the results achieved by the Athlete in the period prior to the CAS award being issued should not be disqualified." On 24 December 2020, the verdict of eight-year ban for Sun was rescinded and referred back to CAS, after the Swiss Federal Tribunal upheld an appeal lodged by Sun against the chair of the CAS Panel. The SFT decision said that "doubts as to the impartiality of the arbitrator were objectively justified"   The later CAS retrial on 22 June 2021 resulted in the suspension still being upheld but reduced the total suspension time to 4 years and three months.

Major achievements
In 2012, Sun became the first Chinese man to win an Olympic gold medal in swimming. He is the first male swimmer in history to earn Olympic and World Championship gold medals at every freestyle distance between 200 and 1500 metres. A three-time Olympic gold medallist and eleven-time world champion, Sun is the most decorated Chinese swimmer in history.

Sun's major achievements include:

Notes

Honours and awards

, Sun has received the following awards:
 Swimming World World Swimmer of the Year Award: 2013
 Swimming World Pacific Rim Swimmer of the Year Award: 2011, 2012, 2013, 2017, 2018
 SwimSwam Swammy Awards "Asian Male Swimmer of the Year" Award: 2017
 FINA "Outstanding Contribution to Swimming Popularity in China" Award: 2017
 FINA World Championships "Best Male Swimmer" Award: 2013, 2015
 China Laureus "Best Male Athlete" Award: 2011, 2017
 China Laureus "Most Popular Male Athlete" Award: 2017
 CCTV Sports Awards "Best Male Athlete" Award: 2011, 2012
 CCTV Sports Awards "Rookie of the Year" Award: 2010
 Zhejiang Province "Best Male Athlete of the Year" Award: 2016

Personal bests

Key: AS = Asian Record, NR = National Record, OR = Olympic Record, WR = World Record

Personal life

On 3 November 2013, Sun was found driving without a licence following a collision in Hangzhou. He was ordered to be detained for seven days by the police and fined . On 4 November, he issued a public apology: "I should have been a role model as an athlete and a public figure, but I failed my responsibility ... I am deeply sorry for what I have done and will reflect on my behavior." On 6 November, the State General Administration of Sports announced that Sun was temporarily banned from the national team swimming camp and all competitions and business-related activities. On 24 April 2014, Sun had his endorsement and business-related ban lifted as a result of "good behavior".

In July 2014, Sun graduated from Zhejiang University with a bachelor's degree in sports studies. According to FINA, Sun "has studied for a master's degree in physical education at Soochow University". In 2018, he began his Doctor of Philosophy degree in kinesiology at the Shanghai University of Sport in Shanghai, China.

Sun's sporting philosophy is "You succeed when you believe that you can succeed". His idol is Chinese swimmer Zhang Lin. In addition to swimming, Sun enjoys listening to music and playing basketball.

See also
 China at the 2012 Summer Olympics
 China at the 2016 Summer Olympics

References

External links
 
 

1991 births
Living people
Sportspeople from Hangzhou
Swimmers from Zhejiang
Chinese male freestyle swimmers
World record holders in swimming
Olympic gold medalists in swimming
Olympic silver medalists in swimming
Olympic bronze medalists in swimming
2016 Olympic gold medalists for China
2016 Olympic silver medalists for China
Olympic bronze medalists for China
Medalists at the 2012 Summer Olympics
Swimmers at the 2016 Summer Olympics
Swimmers at the 2012 Summer Olympics
Swimmers at the 2008 Summer Olympics
World Aquatics Championships medalists in swimming
Asian Games medalists in swimming
Asian Games gold medalists for China
Asian Games silver medalists for China
Swimmers at the 2010 Asian Games
Swimmers at the 2014 Asian Games
Swimmers at the 2018 Asian Games
Doping cases in swimming
Chinese sportspeople in doping cases
Medalists at the 2010 Asian Games
Medalists at the 2014 Asian Games
Medalists at the 2018 Asian Games
Olympic silver medalists for China
Swimming controversies